Local elections were held in the Socialist Republic of Romania on 21 November 1982.

A mandate represented two and a half years, according to 1965 Constitution of Romania.

References 

Local elections in Romania
Local
Romania